Duffy is a 1968 British-American comedy crime film directed by Robert Parrish and starring James Coburn, James Mason, James Fox and Susannah York. Originally called "Avec-Avec", French for "with-it", according to 1967 press reports, Columbia Pictures changed the title of the movie, despite the protests of the stars.

It was shot at Shepperton Studios and on location in Almería. The film's sets were designed by the art director Philip Harrison.

Plot
Duffy is a cunning aristocrat of criminals who is hired by Stefane, a young playboy, to hijack a boat carrying several million dollars of his father's fortune. The plot succeeds, with a little help from Segolene, Stefane's girlfriend - but also with an unexpected, sudden turn of events.

Cast
 James Coburn as Duffy 
 James Mason as Charles 
 James Fox as Stefane 
 Susannah York as Segolene 
 John Alderton as Antony Calvert 
 Guy Deghy as Captain Schoeller
 Carl Duering as Bonivet 
 Tutte Lemkow as Spaniard 
 Marne Maitland as Abdul 
 André Maranne as Inspector Garain (as Andre Maranne)
 Julie Mendez as Belly dancer 
 Barry Shawzin as Bakirgian

References

External links
 
 

1968 films
1960s crime comedy films
1960s heist films
British crime comedy films
British heist films
Columbia Pictures films
Films about dysfunctional families
Films directed by Robert Parrish
Films set in the Mediterranean Sea
Films set in Tangier
Films set in London
Films shot in Almería
Films shot at Shepperton Studios
Seafaring films
1968 comedy films
1960s English-language films
1960s British films